Little Marais may refer to:
 Little Marais, Minnesota, an unincorporated community in Lake County, United States
 Little Marais River, a river of Minnesota, United States

See also
 Little (disambiguation)
 Marais (disambiguation)
 Grand Marais (disambiguation)